Thomas D. Ranson of Staunton in Augusta County, Virginia, was a member of the Confederate Army and served in the Stonewall Brigade under General Thomas Jonathan "Stonewall" Jackson during the American Civil War.

Captain Ranson survived the War and is best remembered for an act of devotion and respect paid to his fallen leader, who died near Chancellorsville, Virginia on May 10, 1863.

Ranson knew of the short and tragic life of Jackson's mother, who had been buried in an unmarked grave in Fayette County along the James River and Kanawha Turnpike when Thomas was orphaned at the age of only 7 in 1831. 

Several years after the war, during the 1880s, Ranson had a marble marker placed over the unmarked grave of Julia Neale Jackson (1798–1831) in Westlake Cemetery, to make sure that the site was not lost forever. Today, local folks in Ansted, in an area which became the new State of West Virginia, tend the gravesite of the young mother and speak of her little orphaned boy who grew up to be the legendary Stonewall Jackson. They also speak of Ranson's gesture, which is considered symbolic of the great affection his troops felt for Stonewall Jackson, who was a deeply religious and somewhat aloof man who put himself in harm's way on numerous occasions to protect his troops.

Year of birth missing
Year of death missing
Confederate States Army officers
People from Staunton, Virginia
Stonewall Brigade